Waldemar Cotelo (born 12 March 1964) is a Uruguayan long-distance runner. He competed in the men's marathon at the 1996 Summer Olympics.

References

1964 births
Living people
Athletes (track and field) at the 1996 Summer Olympics
Uruguayan male long-distance runners
Uruguayan male marathon runners
Olympic athletes of Uruguay
Athletes (track and field) at the 1991 Pan American Games
Pan American Games competitors for Uruguay
Place of birth missing (living people)
South American Games gold medalists for Uruguay
South American Games medalists in athletics
Competitors at the 1990 South American Games